is a Japanese actor.

Biography
Shiramata was a member of Johnny & Associates around 2005. In 2008, he was nominated in the 5th D-Boys audition. Shiramata later became affiliated with Watanabe Entertainment and joined D2 in December 2010.

On March 29, 2019, Shiramata graduated from D-Boys and left Watanabe Entertainment. On July 1, 2020, Shiramata joined G-Star.Pro.

Shiramata's personality traits include honesty and not lying. In Kamen Rider Gaim, while playing Ryoji Hase, the staff asked him to bring out his own personality. His co-star Ryo Matsuda said that he resembled in the character in being gentle with a strong hungry spirit part.

In Kamen Rider Gaim, Shiramata was givens stern words from director Hidenori Ishida and shed tears on the set. However, as a result, he was able to break away from the affected acting of an ikemen star. Ishida praised Shiramata's performance after filming, as did the screenwriter Gen Urobuchi.

Filmography

TV series

Films

References

External links
 Official profile 

21st-century Japanese male actors
1994 births
Living people
People from Kanagawa Prefecture